"Finale" is a song by French DJ and record producer Madeon, featuring vocals from American singer Nicholas Petricca of Walk the Moon. It was released on 22 July 2012 as a digital download in the United Kingdom. The song entered the UK Singles Chart at number 35. The cover art is a coloured silhouette of the skyline of Sydney from the east (which is also used in "Icarus" but with a different background color).

It was used in an NBCSN commercial during the 2012 Summer Olympics and was frequently used throughout the 2013 X Games. It has also featured on an advert for National Geographic Channel and PlayStation Vita. It makes appearances in the video games FIFA 13 as part of its soundtrack and PlayStation All-Stars Battle Royale as its opening theme. The song features on the deluxe edition of his debut studio album, Adventure (2015).

Track listing

Charts

Release history

References

2012 singles
2012 songs
Madeon songs
Song recordings produced by Madeon
Songs written by Madeon